Super Junior-D&E (also known as  Donghae & Eunhyuk, D&E or SJ-D&E) is the fifth sub-unit of South Korean boy band Super Junior, formed by SM Entertainment in 2011. It is composed of two Super Junior members: Donghae and Eunhyuk. The duo debuted on December 16, 2011, with their digital single "Oppa, Oppa".

History

2011–13: Formation and debut 
Donghae & Eunhyuk released debut digital single "Oppa, Oppa" on December 16, 2011. The single contains lead single "Oppa, Oppa" and B-side single "First Love". The duo made their debuted stage on the same day in Music Bank.

The song "Oppa Oppa" was first introduced in Super Show 4 on November 19, 2011. There were two music videos released: the lead music video was released on December 16 and the other music video was released on December 21,  directed by Shindong and starring Amber of f(x), Peter and Youngsky of One Way group and Sungmin and Shindong feature in the music video.

They released a Japanese version of Oppa, Oppa on April 4, 2012. The single also contained lead single "Oppa, Oppa" and B-side single "First Love". "Oppa, Oppa" peaked at #2 on the Oricon single daily and weekly charts, and #1 on the Tower Records single chart.

On June 19, 2013, the duo released their second Japanese single "I Wanna Dance" which also includes the B-side track "Love That I Need" featuring Super Junior-M member Henry.

They released their second digital single "Still You" on December 18, 2013. The music video was filmed in London. They first performed "Still You" at SM Town Week: Super Junior Treasure Island on December 28 and 29.

2014–15: Ride Me, The Beat Goes On, Present and hiatus
The duo released their first full-length Japanese album Ride Me on February 26, 2014, and started using the name Super Junior-D&E since then. They released a short version of the "Motorcycle" promotional video (PV) on February 2. The song became the main theme of the Japanese TV show, 'Sukkiri'.

The duo kicked off their first Japan tour in Nagoya on 4 March 2014, visiting 8 cities including Osaka, Hiroshima, Fukuoka, Kobe, Niigata, Budokan and Tokyo for 22 performances. They sang a total of 22 songs, including "I Wanna Dance", "Oppa Oppa", and "BAMBINA". The boys wrapped up their concert tour from May 8 to 10 in Budokan, attracting a total of 100,000 fans for their 1st Japan Tour. Shortly after D&E 1st Japan Tour, the duo released their 3rd Japanese single titled "Skeleton" on August 6, 2014.

Their first EP, The Beat Goes On was released on March 6. They also held a comeback showcase at the SMTOWN Coex Artium one day before the release of the EP. Donghae participated in the album production along with producers The Underdogs, Hitchhiker, NoizeBank and more. The duo made their comeback performance on the music show Music Bank with the songs "Growing Pains" and "The Beat Goes On" on March 6, 2015, and kept promotions going on Music Core, Inkigayo and M! Countdown. On March 24, The duo released special edition album for The Beat Goes On. Including the seven tracks in the original album, "Oppa, Oppa", "1+1=LOVE", "Still You", "Motorcycle", "Love That I Need", and "I Wanna Dance" from its previous digital singles and Korean versions of Japanese songs for a total of 13 tracks in the special edition album.

On April 1, they released their first Japanese EP titled Present, which contained a total of eight songs including the lead single "Saturday Night". They also held their second Japan tour Super Junior D&E The 2nd Japan Tour - Present- from April 3 till April 23 in four cities Saitama, Osaka, Nagoya and Fukuoka with 10 performances. The concerts concluded with a total attendance of more than 100,000 fans.

The duo held their Asia tour titled "Present" which kicked off in Taipei on June 6, following three other cities in Asia: Hong Kong, Shanghai and Bangkok with total five performances. The duo released their fourth Japanese single titled "Let's Get It On" on September 30.

On October 4, the Gangnam K-Pop Festival was held on Yeongdong Street in Seoul. It marked Donghae and Eunhyuk's final public appearance before heading to the army. As a result, the sub-group temporarily halted their activities during the members' enlistment. Eunhyuk and Donghae enlisted for their mandatory military service on October 13, 2015, and October 15, 2015, respectively.

2017–present: Style, Bout You, Danger, Bad Blood, "Wings" and Countdown
Eunhyuk and Donghae were discharged from their mandatory military service on July 12 and July 14, respectively. They held their fan meeting Hello Again on July 23 at Sejong University Daeyang Hall and participated in SM Town Live World Tour VI in Japan on July 27–28.

The duo released one Japanese song every month starting November 2017 to head their full album releases sometime in 2018. On November 29, they released the first Japanese single of the series, titled "Here We Are". One month later, on December 26, D&E released the second Japanese single titled "You don't go".

On January 31, 2018, they released their third Japanese monthly single titled "If You", written and composed by Donghae. On February 28, 2018, their fourth Japanese monthly single "Circus", with the concept film where Donghae and Eunhyuk downsized into video game characters, playing a "Circus" chase game. On March 28, 2018, their fifth Japanese monthly single, titled "Lose It". The music video with the duo's toy model as main characters, was released in 3 episodes on March 28, 2018, March 30, 2018, and April 1, 2018. On April 2, 2018, the full version of the music video was released. Their sixth Japanese monthly single "Can I Stay..." was released on April 25, 2018. The seventh Japanese monthly single "Hot Babe" was released on May 31, 2018.

In June 2018, D&E announced the release of their second full-length Japanese album titled STYLE on August 8, 2018, which contains every monthly song that had been released and also new songs, including the lead single "Sunrise" and "Polygraph". Following the release of the album, the Japan nationwide tour titled "Style" was held from September 2018 to November 2018 in seven cities: Yokohama, Kobe, Tokyo, Nagoya, Hiroshima, Fukuoka and Sapporo.

D&E released their second Korean EP titled 'Bout You on August 16, 2018. They promoted on TV and on digital platforms through music shows, variety shows, and performances with the lead single, titled the same as the EP. The album was released as three versions: D&E version, Donghae version, and Eunhyuk version. The D&E version ranked #1 on the Gaon chart and sold more than 101,100+ copies.

The subunit released their third Korean EP Danger on April 15, 2019, two days after their first domestic concert in Korea, The D&E. The album debuted at #2 on the Gaon chart in Korea and #23 on the Oricon chart in Japan. It sold over 90,500+ copies. The subunit promoted the album in Korea through various performances and appearances and also throughout Asia with their second Asia tour. The subunit continued their promotions through The D&E until the main group's comeback in the later part of the year.

On December 31, 2019, they performed at Taipei New Year's Eve stage in Taiwan. They sang several of their hit singles, namely "Danger", "Growing Pains", "'Bout You" and "Oppa Oppa".

On September 3, 2020, their fourth EP, Bad Blood was released, alongside Bad Liar on September 28.  On November 25, 2020, they released a Japanese single titled "Wings".

On November 2, 2021, D&E released their first Korean studio album Countdown.  Donghae and Eunhyuk did solo songs as pre-release singles for their upcoming album.  Donghae released the single "California Love" on October 13, featuring Jeno of NCT, while Eunhyuk released the single "Be" on October 20.  On December 10, they will release a special version of their studio album titled Countdown - Zero ver. (Epilogue).

Discography

Korean albums
 Countdown (2021)

Japanese albums
 Ride Me (2014)
 Style (2018)

Tours and concerts

Asia tour
 Super Junior D&E Asia Tour 2015 -Present- (2015)
 The D&E (2019)

Japan tour
 Super Junior D&E The 1st Japan Tour 2014
 Super Junior-D&E Japan Tour 2015 -Present-
 Super Junior-D&E Japan Tour 2018 ~Style~

Supporting act
 2015 FAMILY FESTIVAL 'K-WAVE CONCERT'
2018 Sweet 17 Trans Media

Awards and nominations

References

External links
 Official website  
 Official website 

Japanese-language singers of South Korea
K-pop music groups
Super Junior subgroups
South Korean boy bands
South Korean dance music groups
South Korean musical duos
South Korean synthpop groups
Musical groups established in 2011
Musical groups from Seoul
SM Entertainment artists
SM Town
2011 establishments in South Korea